Damien Smith may refer to:

 Damien Smith (artist) (born 1969), Canadian artist
 Damien Smith (football coach), Australian association football coach
 Damien Smith (journalist), Australian news reporter
 Damien Smith (Neighbours), fictional character on the Australian soap opera Neighbours
 Damien Smith (politician), New Zealand politician
 Damien Smith (rugby league) (born 1974), Australian former rugby league player

See also
Damian Smith (disambiguation)